Linda Bradford Raschke (/'ræʃki/) is an American financier, operating mostly as a commodities and futures trader.

She started as a member of the Pacific Coast Stock Exchange, traded on the Philadelphia Exchange, and then became a registered CTA (Commodity Trading Advisor) and founded LBR Asset Management. 
She retired in 2015 and currently maintains her own private trading operation.

Career 

Raschke began her professional trading career in 1981 as a market maker in equity options as a member of two exchanges. She began her trading career on the Pacific Coast Stock Exchange and later moved to the Philadelphia Stock Exchange. She became a registered CTA (Commodity Trading Advisor) in 1992. Since then, she has been the principle trader for several funds and started her own hedge fund in 2002 for which she was the CPO (Commodity Pool Operator).

Raschke has been a full-time professional trader for over 40 years, and was featured in Jack Schwager's book, The New Market Wizards, as well as the CNBC financial reporter Sue Herera's book, Women of the Street: Making It On Wall Street -- The World's Toughest Business.

In 1995, Raschke co-authored the best selling book, Street Smarts—High Probability Short Term Trading Strategies, with Laurence A. Connors. She has served on the board of directors for the Market Technicians Association and was president of the American Association of Professional Technical Analysts.

Raschke has presented her research and lectured on trading for many globally recognized authorities, including: The Managed Futures Association, American Association of Professional Technical Analysts, International Federation of Technical Analysts, Market Technicians Association, and Bloomberg. She has taught professional and bank traders in over 22 different countries. Additionally, she has been featured in several financial publications, radio, and financial television programs.

After she retired from the professional managed money industry, she wrote and published Trading Sardines: Lessons in the Market From a Lifelong Trader.

References

Further reading

Bensignor, Rick (2000). New Thinking in Technical Analysis: Trading Models from the Masters.
Collins, Art (2002). When Supertraders Meet Kryptonite.
Lo, Andrew and Hasanhodzic, Jasmina (2009). The Heretics of Finance: Conversations with Leading Practitioners of Technical Analysis.
Bourquin, Tim (2013). Traders at Work: How the World's Most Successful Traders Make their Living in the Markets.
William, Jason (2013). The Mental Edge in Trading: Adapt Your Personality Traits and Control Your Emotions to Make Smarter Investments.

External links
 http://lindaraschke.net/

American commodities traders
American derivatives traders
American finance and investment writers
American financiers
American hedge fund managers
American investors
American money managers
American stock traders
Living people
Stock and commodity market managers
Technical analysts
American women investors
Women stock traders
American business writers
1959 births
20th-century American businesspeople
20th-century American non-fiction writers
20th-century American women writers
21st-century American businesspeople
Women business writers
American women non-fiction writers
20th-century American businesswomen
21st-century American businesswomen